Nicola Correia-Damude (born 21 June 1981) is a Canadian actress based in Toronto.

Career

Television and film
Correia-Damude has had recurring roles on Shadowhunters, Annedroids, The Boys and The Strain. Additional television credits include Haven, Degrassi: The Next Generation, and Stargate SG-1. Film credits include Margarita, Havana 57, and Memory. She also had a recurring role (33 episodes from 2017 to 2019) as the mother in the Canadian children's show, Dino Dana.

Theatre
Correia-Damude is a graduate of Etobicoke School of the Arts, Studio 58, and the Birmingham Conservatory for Classical Theatre. Her theatre credits include Coriolanus and Much Ado About Nothing at the Stratford Festival, Serious Money and The Women and Albertine in Five Times at the Shaw Festival, as well as premieres of new Canadian works The Madonna Painter (Factory Theatre), Within the Glass (Tarragon Theatre) and Botticelli in the Fire & Sunday in Sodom (Canadian Stage).

Voice acting
Correia-Damude has supplied voice overs for CBC's The Passionate Eye, Afghanada, The Fifth Estate, Starlink: Battle for Atlas, and David Suzuki Explores.

Personal life
An actress of mixed heritage (her mother is from Guyana and her father is Canadian), Correia-Damude is "an advocate of increased cultural diversity in film, television and theatre; expanding roles for women; and improving conditions for mothers and families in the film and television industry." As well as an actress, she is also a singer-songwriter, plays piano and guitar, and has a dance background in modern, classical, jazz, step and tap. Her father, Brian Damude, is a photographer and film director most noted for the 1975 film Sudden Fury.

She is bisexual. She has been married to actor Carlos Gonzalez-Vio since 2013, with whom she has a son.

Filmography

Video games

Awards and nominations
Correia-Damude has been nominated for a Canadian Screen Award for her guest performance on Remedy and received the Best Actress in a Feature Film award at the San Diego FilmOut Festival for her work in Margarita.

References

External links
 
 

1981 births
Living people
Bisexual actresses
Canadian film actresses
Canadian people of Guyanese descent
Canadian Screen Award winners
Canadian television actresses
Canadian voice actresses
Canadian LGBT actors